Gilberto Reyes (born February 19, 1981 in Lawrence, Massachusetts) is a professional boxer.

Reyes, whose nickname is "Sugar", fights out of Miami, Florida. He has been featured numerous times on ESPN2 and Telemundo. In February 2005, Reyes beat Carlos González for the vacant WBA Fedecentro Title. He lost the title less than a year later in a 7th round knockout by Cosme Rivera.

In his first fight of 2007, in the Miguel Cotto-Oktay Urkal undercard & having lost 2 straight being The fifth fight of the evening which also was a short one when Cotto's sparring partner Gilberto Reyes (18-5-1, 11 KOs) suffered a broken jaw in the first round of his bout against Carlos de la Cruz (9-6, 9 KOs). Reyes appeared to win the first round but did not come out for the second.

As of March 2007, his record is 18-5 with 11 KOs.

External links

 Myspace of Gil Reyes
 

1981 births
American male boxers
Boxers from Massachusetts
Living people
Sportspeople from Lawrence, Massachusetts
Welterweight boxers